Thundering Hoofs is a 1924 American silent Western film directed by Albert S. Rogell and starring Fred Thomson, Ann May, and William Lowery.

Plot
As described in a review in a film magazine, Dave Marshall (Thomson) fights Luke Severn (Lowery) when he finds him beating his beautiful white horse Silver King on the understanding the horse is to be allowed to choose his master, and the horse chooses Dave. Severn arranges with bandits to waylay a coach carrying Don Estrada (Mailes), who is carrying money, and his daughter Carmelita (May). Dave saves the situation by lassoing all the bandits and suspending them from a tree. The coach's horses run away, but Dave catches up to the coach, grasps the wagon pole from beneath, pulls himself up to the seat and stops the runaway coach. However, Severn slanders him by telling Don Estrada Dave is a bandit. Dave nevertheless continues to visit Carmelita on the sly, and meets with narrow escapes and much adventure. The Don and Carmelita return to Mexico and she writes Dave, saying she is to be forced to marry Severn. Dave follows, seeking to prevent the wedding. He is thrown in jail by the infuriated Don. Severn secures Silver King, beats the horse, and finally sends it into the bull ring. Dave manages to escape and he dashes through the streets, eluding the Mexican soldiers by climbing over housetops, leaping from one to another, finally landing in the ring just as the horse is knocked down. Seizing the maddened bull by the horns, he gives the excited populace the thrill of their lives by using his cowboy experience in bulldogging the animal. The audience goes wild with enthusiasm. After a sheriff from the United States arrives with a warrant charging Severn with being the leader of a gang of bandits, the Don gives his consent to Dave’s marriage to Carmelita.

Cast

 Fred Thomson as Dave Marshall 
 Ann May as Carmelita Estrada 
 William Lowery as Luke Severn 
 Fred Huntley as John Marshall 
 Charles Hill Mailes as Don Juan Estrada 
 Charles De Ravenne as Don Carlos Estrada 
 Carrie Clark Ward as Duenna 
 Willie Fung as Cook

Preservation
Prints of Thundering Hoofs are held by the UCLA Film and Television Archive and private collections.

References

Bibliography
 Donald W. McCaffrey & Christopher P. Jacobs. Guide to the Silent Years of American Cinema. Greenwood Publishing, 1999.

External links
 

1924 films
1924 Western (genre) films
1920s English-language films
American black-and-white films
Films directed by Albert S. Rogell
Film Booking Offices of America films
Silent American Western (genre) films
1920s American films